L'Amour, Madame is a French comedy film from 1952, directed by Gilles Grangier, written by Félix Gandéra, starring Arletty and Jean Marais. The film was known under the title "Coups de soleil" or "Les jeux de la plage et du hasard" (France), "Die Liebe mit 20" (West Germany), "Love, Madame" (USA).

Plot
Madame Célerier is determined to marry off her son François to a rich and haughty woman but François has other plans.

Cast 
 Arletty as herself
 François Périer as François Célerier
 Marie Daëms as Diane Broussard
 Clément Thierry as Alain Broussard
 Nadine Basile as Michèle Broussard
 Marcelle Hainia as Mrs Broussard
 Jacqueline Noëlle as actress
 Michel Boulau as young man
 Daniel Cauchy as young man
 Constance Thierry as young woman
 Carmen de Lara as young woman
 Jeanne Fusier-Gir as Berthe
 Robert Burnier as Mr Broussard
 Mireille Perrey as Mrs Célerier
 Jean Marais as (uncredited)

References

External links 
 
 L'Amour, Madame (1952) at the Films de France

1952 films
French comedy-drama films
1950s French-language films
French black-and-white films
Films directed by Gilles Grangier
1952 comedy-drama films
1950s French films